The Antenna Awards is an Australian awards ceremony which recognises outstanding achievements in community television production. First held in 2004, the ceremony is produced by C31 Melbourne, and is broadcast by terrestrial community television stations (colloquially known as Channel 31) across Australia.

Nominations are accepted from producers, presenters and other volunteers within the sector for programming produced within the eligibility period of each ceremony. Entries are judged entirely by a panel decided by the event organisers; previously, the Viewers' Choice Award allowed for Channel 31 viewers to nominate their favourite programs in a given year.

Between 2004 and 2010 the awards were held annually – first at RMIT University's Storey Hall, and later at the Deakin Edge at Federation Square. In 2014, the awards were revived to honour 20 years of community television in Brisbane and Melbourne, and were held again in 2019 to honour 25 years of C31 Melbourne.

Original run

2004

2005
 Best Comedy Program – The Shambles, Nathan Valvo & Sean Lynch
 Best Drama Program – The Video Store, Sam Barrett & Adrian Mcfarlane
 Best Arts Program – Gallery Watch, Tibor Meszaros
 Best Music Program – Turkish Star Australia, Ses Promotions
 Best Variety Program – Get Up Tucked, Ricarp Productions
 Best News/Current Affairs Program – The Sauce, Alison Murphy & Natasha Duckett
 Best Interview Program – Ro Tv, Curtin University & Rotary Wa
 Best Sports Program – The Hockey Show, Dan Miles & Hugh Jellie
 Best Panel Program – No Limits, Sarah Barton
 Best Live / Outside Broadcast Program – Carols in the Park, Dean Gray & Peter Wood (Videoworks)
 Best Indigenous Program – Beyond Their Limits, Paul Deeming & Chris Bayley
 Best Children's Program – Hello Music, Karen Kim
 Best Youth Program – Teenwire, Simon Hydzik & Glenn Clarke
 Best Living & Learning Program – End To End – Lawn Bowls in Wa, Allan Blair & Simon Hydzik
 Best Culturally & Linguistically Diverse Program – Salam Café, Ahmed Hassan
 Best Faith Based & Spiritual Development Program – Salam Café, Ahmed Hassan
 Best Sound – Plug-In, Simon Moule & Salvador Castro
 Best Camerawork – Citylife, Anthony Abicair
 Best Editing – Plug-In, Simon Moule & Salvador Castro
 Best Music Composition – The C Word "31 Song", Nicky Bomba
 Best Director – The Shambles, Nathan Valvo, Sean Lynch & Anthony Ziella
 Best Program Id/Main Title/Promo – The Sauce (Promo), Alison Murphy & Natasha Duckett
 Best Sponsorship Announcement – Acland St Traders Association, Graham C Irwin
 Best Program That Supports Local Metropolitan Communities – Get Up Tucked, Ricarp Productions
 Best Program That Supports Local Rural And Regional Communities – Exmouth on Show, Anita Krsnik & Michael Zampogna
 Best New Producer – Simon Christie & Miranda Christie, 4wd Tv
 Best Female Presenter – Krystal Manson, This Town Brisbane
 Best Male Presenter – Dieter Kahsnitz, The C Word
 Viewer's Choice Award – 4wd Tv, Simon Christie & Miranda Christie
 Producer of the Year – Campbell Manderson, Debra Weddall & Jacinta Hicken, The Activist Awards
 Program of the Year – No Limits, Sarah Barton

2006
 Best Comedy Program – The Ugly Stick
 Best Drama Program – Yartz
 Best Arts Program – Masterclass in Oils
 Best Music Program – On the Couch
 Best Variety Program – Teenwire
 Best News/Current Affairs Program – QUT News
 Best Interview Program – C-Word
 Best Sports Program – Wake Life
 Best Panel Program – No Limits
 Best Live or Outside Broadcast Program –  Science in the Pub
 Best Indigenous Program – Bobtales
 Best Children's Program – Jelly Jym
 Best Youth Program – Class TV
 Best Living and Learning Program – The Garden Tap
 Best Culturally and Linguistically Diverse Program – Fusion Latina
 Best Personal and/or Spiritual Development Program – Tickets Passport and Tarot
 Best Sound – The Launch
 Best Camerawork – Michael Rachelle – Sk82death 
 Best Editing – Simon Hydzik – Teenwise
 Best Music Composition – Ugly Stick
 Best Director – Mat Jones – Public Holiday
 Best Program ID/Main Title/Promo – 123 TV
 Best Sponsorship Announcement – Ugly Stick � Crumpler Bag
 Best Program that Supports Local Metropolitan Communities – Local Knowledge
 Best Program that Supports Rural and Regional Communities – Northam Back to Future
 Best New Producer – Lyn Vickery & Rob Solomon – Wake Up Perth
 Best Female Presenter – On the Couch – Steph Rogers 
 Best Male Presenter – C-Word – Dieter Kahsntiz
 Producer of the Year – Don Miles & Hugh Jellie – Hockey Show
 Program of the Year – Salam Café

2007
* Best Living and Learning Program : No Limits
 Best Program that Supports New and Emerging Communities: Salam Café
 Best Comedy:  In Wollongong Tonight
 Best Young Persons program:  sk82death
 Best Indigenous program:  Bobtales
 Best Arts:  Rock and Roll Cooking Show
 Best Program that Promotes Community Harmony & Diversity:   No Limits
 Best Drama:  One Night Stand
 Best Music Composition:  More Amore
 Best Music program:  Rock and Roll Cooking Show
 Best Female presenter:  Vanity Pets
 Best Male presenter:  Vasili's Garden (Vasili Kanidiadis)
 Best Live or outside broadcast:  Barnaby Flowers
 Best Sports:  sk82death
 Best News or Current Affairs:  The C News Focus Special
 Best CALD program:  Salam Cafe
 Best Camerawork:  sk82death
 Best Editing:  The Ugly Stick
 Best Director: The Ugly Stick
 Best Producer:  Kids Life
 Best Sound:  Rock and Roll Cooking Show
 Outstanding Production Achievement:  Geraldton on Show
 Program of the Year: Signpost
 Outstanding Contribution to Community Television:  Andrew Brine
 Viewers' Choice Award:  4WD TV

2008
The 2008 awards ceremony were held at the BMW Edge theatre, Federation Square on Thursday, 24 April, and broadcast on Sunday, 27 April at 7.30 pm.

 Best Indigenous Program – Noongar Dundjoo
 Nominees: Totally School, Nunga Lounge, Urban Chesspieces, The Marngrook Footy Show
 Best News or Current Affair Program – Wake Up! WA
 Nominees: Tea Tree Gully TV Naturally Better, SKA Story, State Question Time, The Union Show
 Best Camera Work – The Goin' Ballistyx Snowboard Show
 Nominees: Let's Go Birdwatching, Making the Switch, Gasolene, Mystical Guides Haunted Australia
 Best Editing – Making the Switch
 Nominees: The Bazura Project, Living on the Coast, Flicktease
 Best Program that supports New and Emerging Communities – Sri Lanka Morning Show
 Nominees: Talent Pool, SKA Story, VNTV, Pinoy TV
 Best Music Program – Asylum
 Nominees: T Sessions, Pinoy Music Lounge, Songwriters Across Australia, Access All Areas TV
 Best Theme Music Composition – Penguin TV
 Nominees: Play Kool, Room to Grow, Wake Life, No Limits
 Best Young Persons Program – Class TV
 Nominees: Fusion Latina, Totally School, Hit TV, Minnie Monkey
 Best Live or Outside Broadcast – The Breakfast Show
 Nominees: WAFL ON, No Limits, Viva Melbourne, Wake Up! WA
 Best Lifestyle Program – Making The Switch
 Nominees: Let's Go Bird Watching, Kids Life, Living on the Coast, Latin Dance Alive
 Best Comedy Program – The Bazura Project
 Nominees: Planet Nerd, Barnaby Flowers Bumper Bonanza, twentysomething
 Best Interview Show – Ngulla Pt 1 and 2
 Nominees: The MS Show,  The Shtick, Adelaide Vibe, A Life in Crime
 Best Sound – The Gascoyne Dash
 Nominees: The Bazura Project, The Union Show, Barnaby Flowers, Mystical Guides
 Best Sports Program – The Marngrook Footy Show
 Nominees: ALHL Ice Hockey, The Hockey Show, Ten Pin Bowling, On the Water
 Best Special Presentation – Making Monsters
 Nominees: The Gascoyne Dash, Mystical Guides, The Marngrook Footy Show Grand Final Show, The Union Show
 Best Arts Program – The Bazura Project
 Nominees: The Green Room, Blurb, Painting with John, Popcorn
 Best CALD Program – ** Sign Post
 Viva Melbourne, Hello Australia, Fusion Latina, Sri Lanka Morning Show
 Best Female Presenter – Emma Race (The Breakfast Show)
 Nominees: Mahlia Simpson (Kids Life), Jodie Raquel (The Italian Guide), Natasha Ferre (The Goin Ballistyx Snowboarding Show), Yvonne Goldsmith (Latin Dance Alive)
 Best Male Presenter – Michael Kuzilny (A Life in Crime)
 Nominees: Phil Cleary (The Union Show), Charlie Barilla (Charlie's Kitchen), Nick Ball (The Hockey Show), Todd Wright (Sign Post)
 Best Director – Lee Zachariah (The Bazura Project)
 Nominees: Mystical Guides, Jess Harris & Josh Schmidt (twentysomething), Sylvi Soeharjono (Latin Dance Alive), Peter Weatherall (Penguin TV)
 Producer of the Year – Emma Race (The Breakfast Show)
 Nominees: Tim Egan (The Bazura Project), Michael Curson (Gasolene), Global Vision Media (Making the Switch), Jess Harris (twentysomething)
 Best Program – Making the Switch
 Nominees: The MS Show, The Goin' Ballistyx Snow Boarding Show, Let's Go Bird Watching, Play Kool
 Outstanding Contribution to Community Television – Josie Parrelli
 Viewers' Choice Award – 4WD TV

2009
 Outstanding Arts Program – The Bazura Project
 Outstanding Comedy Program – Talking Comics With Gazz & Dazz
 Outstanding Development Program – The Red Room
 Outstanding Female Presenter – Kat Bergin; Theatregames Live
 Outstanding Interview Program – No Limits
 Outstanding Lifestyle Program – Vasili's Garden
 Outstanding Male Presenter – Steve Hurd - No Limits
 Outstanding Music Program – Scout Tv
 Outstanding News Program – The Union Show
 Outstanding Special Presentation/One Off Program – ATVAA; Racing with the Seadragons
 Outstanding Cald Program – Fusion Latina
 Outstanding Cald Producer: Milano Livera – Fusion Latina
 Outstanding Exterior Broadcast Program – Studio A
 Outstanding Program of the Year – Studio A
 Outstanding Recreational Program – On The Water
 Outstanding Sports Program – The Surfers Life
 Outstanding Technical Excellence – Living on the Coast
 Outstanding Contribution Community Tv Program – David Mclaughlin
 Outstanding Theme Music – Brain Date
 Outstanding Youth Program – 1700

2010
In 2010, C31 Melbourne Antenna Awards were held on Sunday 27 June at BMW Edge from Federation Square, Melbourne.

 Program of the Year - Dare I Ask?
 Outstanding Achievement in Technical Innovation – The Mutant Way
 Outstanding Arts Program - Fusion Latina
 Outstanding Comedy Program – The Mutant Way
 Outstanding Culturally And Linguistically Diverse Program - The Pinoy Lounge
 Outstanding Factual, Current Affairs Or Interview Program – Dare I Ask?
 Outstanding Female Presenter - Jackie Doran: The Naughty Rude Show
 Outstanding Male Presenter – Mitch Mctaggart: Socially Inadequate
 Outstanding Information Or Lifestyle Program - Horse Talk Tv
 Outstanding Live Or Outside Broadcast Program – The Inquiry
 Outstanding Music Program – Asylum Tv
 Outstanding Original Theme Music Composition – Dancing About Architecture – Ben Birchall And Dave Mcgann
 Outstanding Outdoor Recreational Program - Hound Tv
 Outstanding Sports Program - The Local Footy Show
 Outstanding Young Persons Program – The Naughty Rude Show

Revivals
On 1 July 2014, C31 Melbourne announced the return of the Antenna Awards for 2014, to mark 20 years since the first broadcasts of C31 Melbourne and 31 Digital Brisbane. Following the success of a Pozible crowdfunding campaign, the 2014 Antenna Awards were held on 1 October 2014 at the Deakin Edge at Federation Square in Melbourne, with 13 Antennas awarded.

On 4 July 2019, C31 Melbourne announced a second revival of the Antenna Awards, marking 25 years since the channel's first broadcast. The 2019 Antenna Awards were held on 5 October 2019, with 24 Antennas awarded.

On 1 February 2021, C31 Melbourne announced a third revival of the Antenna Awards. The 2021 Antenna Awards will be held on 19 June 2021, instead of 29 May 2021, and will mark the 10th time the awards have been held since their inception in 2004.

Awards
As of the 2019 Antenna Awards, awards are given in 23 categories:

 Outstanding Direction in a Program
 Outstanding Sound in a Program
 Outstanding Editing in a Program
 Outstanding Camera Work in a Program
 Outstanding Theme Song in a Program
 Best Comedy Program
 Best Music Program
 Best Factual, Current Affairs or Interview Program
 Best Culturally and/or Linguistically Diverse Program
 Best Special Interest or Lifestyle Program
 Best Sports Program
 Best Outdoor or Recreational Program
 Best Youth Program
 Best Live and/or Outside Broadcast
 Best Narrative and/or Fictional Program
 Best Actor in a Narrative Drama, Comedy or Sketch
 Best Journalism in a Program
 Best Culturally and/or Linguistically Diverse Personality
 Youth Personality of the Year
 Personality of the Year
 Outstanding Creative Achievement in a Program
 Outstanding Contribution to Community by a Program
 Program of the Year

See also
 List of television awards

References

External links
 C31 – The Antenna Awards

 
Australian community television
Australian community access television shows
Awards established in 2004
2004 establishments in Australia
Australian comedy awards
Television shows set in Melbourne